The Swedish Post and Telecom Authority (abbreviated PTS) is a government authority under the Ministry of Infrastructure (Sweden) and is managed by a board of directors appointed by the Swedish government. The Director-General is the chief executive officer of the organisation. Dan Sjöblom has served as Director General since February 2017.

PTS is the sector authority within the field of electronic communications and postal services. Their area of responsibility is to monitor competition and consumer issues in this field; ensuring efficient utilisation of resources and  secure communications in mail, telephony, the Internet and radio.

See also
 Spectrum auction

References

External links
The Swedish Post and Telecom Authority – Official website (English)

Government agencies of Sweden
Telecommunications regulatory authorities
Regulation in Sweden